Luis Eugenio Basterra  (born 14 October 1958) is an Argentine agricultural engineer and politician. He was the country's Minister of Agriculture, Livestock and Fisheries from 10 December 2019 to 20 September 2021, in the cabinet of President Alberto Fernández.

From 2011 to 2019 he was a member of the Argentine Chamber of Deputies representing Formosa Province; he also served as vice-president of the National Agricultural Technology Institute (INTA) from 2009 to 2011 and as Minister of Production of Formosa Province from 2003 to 2009 in the administration of Governor Gildo Insfrán.

Early life and education
Basterra was born in Resistencia, Chaco Province, in 1958. In 1988 he graduated as an agricultural engineer from the National University of the Northeast (UNNE). In his youth he was a member of the Popular Socialist Party, but later joined the ranks of the Justicialist Party when he moved to Formosa.

Political career

Provincial politics and work in INTA
In 1996 he was appointed Undersecretary of Employment in the Formosa Ministry of Economy, Public Works and Services by Governor Gildo Insfrán; he was in the position until 2000, when he was appointed to the Undersecretariat of Commerce and Investment within the same ministry. In 2003 Insfrán appointed him Minister of Production of the province; Basterra held this post until 2009. In 2009 he also briefly served as president of the Consejo Federal de Medio Ambiente (COFEMA).

From 13 October 2009 to 10 December 2011 Basterra served as vice president of the National Agricultural Technology Institute of Argentina (INTA). During his tenure at INTA, he sought to promote and expand the reach of aquaculture in Argentina.

Congressional terms
At the 2011 general election Basterra was the 3rd candidate in the Front for Victory (FPV) list to the Chamber of Deputies in Formosa; the FPV won nearly 80% of the vote and Basterra was elected. Shortly after taking office he was elected by the FPV majority to preside over the Agriculture Commission in the lower chamber of Congress.

In 2015 he was re-elected to the Chamber, this time placing first in the FPV party list in Formosa. He was re-elected a third time in 2019.

Minister of Agriculture
On 10 December 2019, Basterra was appointed Minister of Agriculture, Livestock and Fisheries by President Alberto Fernández as part of the new cabinet of Argentina, succeeding Luis Miguel Etchevehere. Following the government's poor showings in the 2021 legislative primary elections, Basterra was replaced by Julián Domínguez as part of a cabinet reshuffle.

Personal life
Basterra is a vegetarian.

References

External links

Official website of the Ministry of Agriculture (in Spanish)

1958 births
Living people
Agricultural engineers
Ministers of agriculture of Argentina
Members of the Argentine Chamber of Deputies elected in Formosa
People from Resistencia, Chaco